Polygordiidae is a family of polychaetes belonging to the class Polychaeta, order unknown.

Genera:
 Chaetogordius Moore, 1904
 Polycoryna
 Polygordius Schneider, 1868

References

Annelids